Nicolaes Borremans (c. 1614 – 1679) became in 1649 a Remonstrant preacher in Nieuwkoop and in Maasland from 1650 till 1679 when, due to a disease, he asked to be dismissed after which he was pensioned off.

Borremans was born in Amsterdam. Some of his poems are to be found in the anthology , published in Amsterdam in 1659.

External link and source
This article is a compilation of biographical data from the web site of the digital library of Dutch literature

1610s births
1679 deaths
Dutch male poets
Writers from Amsterdam
Remonstrants
Arminian writers
Arminian ministers